John Gibson  was  an English priest in the late 16th and early 17th centuries.

Gibson educated at Lincoln College, Oxford, graduating BA in 1570: he was a Fellow there from 1571 to 1583.  He was appointed a Canon of York in 1571 and  Precentor in 1574. He was Archdeacon of the East Riding from 1578 until his death on 28 February 1613.

Notes

1613 deaths
Archdeacons of the East Riding
Alumni of Lincoln College, Oxford